Igor Olegovich Shestyorkin (commonly spelled as Shesterkin; born 30 December 1995) is a Russian professional ice hockey goaltender for the New York Rangers of the National Hockey League (NHL). He was selected by the Rangers in the fourth round, 118th overall, of the 2014 NHL Entry Draft. In his first 82-game season in 2021–22, Shesterkin won the Vezina Trophy as the league's best goaltender.

Playing career

KHL
Shesterkin played as a youth with Krylya Sovetov Moscow before he was selected by Spartak Moscow of the Kontinental Hockey League, 43rd overall in the 2012 KHL Draft, as a 16-year old. He played his first season within Spartak, at the MHL level, featuring for MHK Spartak in the 2012–13 season.

Shesterkin made his professional and KHL debut midway through the following 2013–14 season, recalled from MHK to close out the final 8 minutes for Spartak in relief of Alexei Ivanov in a 5–3 defeat to HC Ugra on 20 January 2014. He was given his first start three days later, allowing two goals in a 3–1 loss to Lokomotiv Yaroslavl on 23 January. In his eighth appearance, Shesterkin collected his first win, making 33 saves in a 3–0 shutout victory over HC Slovan Bratislava on 2 March. Returning the MHL, Shesterkin registered a 12–7 record in 19 playoff games, along with a 1.75 goals against averange and a .937 save percentage, and four shutouts to help MHK Spartak win the MHL Championship.

While out of contract from Spartak and showing strong potential, Shesterkin signed a contract with perennial powerhouse SKA Saint Petersburg on 6 June 2014. As the fifth ranked goalie entering the 2014 NHL Entry Draft, Shesterkin was selected in the fourth round, 118th overall, by the New York Rangers on 28 June.

NHL

2019–2021: North American debut
On 3 May 2019, Shesterkin signed a two-year, entry-level contract with the New York Rangers. Shesterkin played in his first NHL preseason game on 21 September, stopping 36 of 40 shots in a 4–1 loss to the Philadelphia Flyers. He was assigned to the Hartford Wolf Pack, the Rangers' minor league affiliate team with the American Hockey League. Shesterkin made his AHL debut during Hartford's 2019–20 season opener on 5 October, during which he made 26 saves in a 5–3 win against the Charlotte Checkers. On 6 January 2020, the Rangers recalled Shesterkin after having success for the Wolf Pack with whom he posted a 15–4–3 record and was named to the 2020 AHL All-Star Classic. In his NHL debut with the Rangers on 7 January, Shesterkin made 29 saves in a 5–3 win against the Colorado Avalanche. Two days later, Shesterkin became the sixth Rangers' goaltender to win his first two games with the team. On 23 February 2020, Shesterkin and teammate Pavel Buchnevich were involved in a car crash. Shesterkin suffered a rib fracture following the incident.

On 13 April 2021, Shesterkin earned his first shutout of his NHL career in a 3–0 win against the New Jersey Devils. Subsequently, Shesterkin recorded his second career shutout in the next game against the Devils in a 4–0 contest on 15 April. He became the second Rangers rookie with back-to-back shutouts, and the first Ranger with back-to-back shutouts since Antti Raanta in December 2016. He also became the third Ranger in franchise history with shutouts versus the same opponent in consecutive games.

2021–22: Breakout and Eastern Conference Final run
On 9 August 2021, Shesterkin signed a four-year, $22.67 million contract extension with the Rangers. On 18 October, Shesterkin made 40 out of 41 saves during a 2–1 overtime victory over the Toronto Maple Leafs. It was his seventh win with 40-plus saves since his NHL debut in January 2020; the most among all goaltenders during that time span. On 20 February 2022, after defeating the Ottawa Senators 2–1, Shesterkin became the 14th NHL goaltender with at least 50 wins in 79 starts. He concluded the 2021–22 regular season with a 36–13–4 record, leading the league in both save percentage and goals against average. Shesterkin was widely hailed as having had one of the finest showings for a goaltender in the history of the NHL. This attracted considerable speculation as to whether he should be a contender for the Hart Memorial Trophy as the league's most valuable player, seldom awarded to netminders. On 10 May, he was named as a finalist for the Vezina Trophy, awarded to the league's best goaltender. Two days later he was named as a Hart Trophy finalist, the first goaltender so honoured in five years. He ultimately won the Vezina and finished third in Hart voting.

The Rangers finished second in the Metropolitan Division, and in the opening round of the 2022 Stanley Cup playoffs faced the Pittsburgh Penguins, whose starting goaltender Tristan Jarry was sidelined by injury. In Game 1, Shesterkin's NHL playoff debut on 3 May, he made 79 saves in the 4–3 triple overtime loss, setting the all-time team record for saves in a playoff game, with the second most saves in a playoff game league-wide. Following a Rangers win in Game 2, the Rangers lost Games 3 and 4 by wide margins, with Shesterkin replaced by Alexandar Georgiev in the second period of each game. The Rangers subsequently rallied to win the next three games and clinch the series. In the next series against the Carolina Hurricanes, the Rangers rallied back from a 2–0 series deficit to win again in 7 games. Shesterkin was again generally considered the difference-maker for his team, backstopping them to key wins when outshot. He finished with a .949 save percentage in the series. Shesterkin became the first goaltender in NHL history to have two assists in a playoff game in which his team faced elimination, and the fifth goaltender with two assists in a single playoff game, as well as the first Rangers goaltender with at least two assists in any game since Mike Richter in a 1992 game against the Quebec Nordiques.

The Rangers advanced to the Eastern Conference Final for the first time since 2015, facing the two-time consecutive and defending Stanley Cup champion Tampa Bay Lightning. The contest with the Lightning was widely framed as a competition between Shesterkin and Lightning goaltender Andrei Vasilevskiy, the previous year's Conn Smythe Trophy winner for playoff MVP. Vasilevsky was considered by many, including Shesterkin himself, to be the best goaltender in the world. The Rangers ultimately lost to the Lightning in six games, while Shesterkin recorded a .929 save percentage over the course of the playoffs. Shesterkin was named a First Team All-Star after the end of the playoffs.

2022–23 All-Star season
Shesterkin was selected by the National Hockey League to participate in the 2023 NHL All-Star Game (his first), making him the seventh goaltender in Rangers history to be an all-star. He joins fellow Rangers goalies, Chuck Rayner, Gump Worsley, Ed Giacomin, Gilles Villemure, Mike Richter, and Henrik Lundqvist.

International play

Shesterkin was a member of the Olympic Athletes from Russia team at the 2018 Winter Olympics. While capturing the gold medal, he did not see any action throughout the tournament as the nation's third goaltender.

Shesterkin represented Russia and was one of top goaltenders at the following 2018 World Championships in Denmark. He finished with two victories – both shutouts – and a 1.46 goals against average and a .942 save percentage, both of which were the third-best at the event.

Career statistics

Regular season and playoffs

International

Awards and honours

References

External links
 

1995 births
Hartford Wolf Pack players
HC Spartak Moscow players
Ice hockey people from Moscow
Ice hockey players at the 2018 Winter Olympics
Living people
Medalists at the 2018 Winter Olympics
New York Rangers draft picks
New York Rangers players
Olympic gold medalists for Olympic Athletes from Russia
Olympic ice hockey players of Russia
Olympic medalists in ice hockey
Russian ice hockey goaltenders
SKA Saint Petersburg players
SKA-1946 players
SKA-Neva players
Vezina Trophy winners
Russian expatriate sportspeople in the United States
Russian expatriate ice hockey people
Expatriate ice hockey players in the United States